Matti Jokinen (born 8 November 1928) was a Finnish footballer. He played in seven matches for the Finland national football team from 1953 to 1957. He was also part of Finland's team for their qualification matches for the 1954 FIFA World Cup.

References

External links
 

1928 births
Possibly living people
Finnish footballers
Finland international footballers
Place of birth missing (living people)
Association footballers not categorized by position